Wendy Seegers (née Hartman; born 28 February 1976) is a South African athlete who specialised in the sprinting events. She represented her country at the 1999 Indoor and 1999 Outdoor Championships. Seegers is currently a masters runner in Australia, setting many national W35 sprint records. Ran 55.72 on 17/12/15 for 400m to set national 35-39 Australian record. This adds to  her records  for 60m of 7.61, 100m of 12.01 and 200m of 24.42. On 3 March 2016 Seegers set a W40 Australian record of  24.52 for the 200m. She followed this with another Australian record of 12.18 for W40 100m. This is only 1 second outside her lifetime best.

At the 2016 World Masters Championships in Perth, Seegers dominated the W40 age group sprints, easily winning the 100m and 200m, despite carrying a significant knee injury. Her 100m time of 11.88 (+3.4) was the fastest women's time overall and she was the only woman to run below 12 seconds. Seegers led  both relays to victory to remain undefeated at the championships.

Wendy Seegers cemented her reputation as the top W40 masters sprinter in the world with these performances. She is a much loved and valued member of WAMA with her work ethic, integrity and helpfulness to other athletes. She is often cheered on by her husband, Gys and children Jundro, Jeanae and Janko.

Competition record

Personal bests
Outdoor
100 metres – 11.18 (-1.0 m/s) (Pretoria 1999)
200 metres – 22.74 (-1.1 m/s) (Roodepoort 1999)

Indoor
60 metres – 7.15 (Maebashi 1999) NR
200 metres – 23.16 (Maebashi 1999) NR

References

1976 births
Living people
South African female sprinters
South African emigrants to Australia
Australian female sprinters
Athletes (track and field) at the 1999 All-Africa Games
African Games competitors for South Africa